CNTV may refer to:

 China Network Television, a Chinese web-based TV broadcaster
 National Television Council (Chile), a Chilean government agency overseeing television
 National Television Commission (Colombia),, a Colombian government agency overseeing television; see Television in Colombia
 Chinese News TV, a Philippine TV channel; see 2019 in Philippine television
 USC School of Cinema-Television (CNTV), former name of the USC School of Cinematic Arts

See also

 CNT (disambiguation)
 CTV (disambiguation)
 NTV (disambiguation)
 
 CN (disambiguation)
 TV (disambiguation)